Joseph van Severdonck (1819–1905) was a Belgian artist.  

Severdonck specialized in historical and genre paintings and studied under Wappers. Critical reception of his works was mixed. Walter Shaw Sparrow, who studied under him and considered him a "noted character", wrote of him in his memoirs.

Work titles include:
 The Judgement of Solomon (ca. about 1850), oil on canvas
 14 Stations, (Church of Notre Dame, Namur)
 Battle of Graveungen (1855);
 Defence of Tournay in 1581
 Visitation of Mary (1862)
 Ballot among the Gypsies
 Battle of Vucht, (Palace of Justice, Ghent )
 Cavalry Attack

Notes

Van Severdonck, Joseph
1819 births
1905 deaths